Bo Persson is a sound mixer. On 24 January 2012 he was nominated for an Academy Award for the film The Girl with the Dragon Tattoo.

References

External links

Living people
Swedish audio engineers
Year of birth missing (living people)